Collège Durocher Saint-Lambert (CDSL) is a private co-ed Roman Catholic secondary school in Saint-Lambert, Quebec, Canada. Its language of instruction is French.

The CDSL operates two campuses. The Saint-Lambert Pavilion is used by students in the first cycle of secondary school. The Durocher Pavilion is used by students in the second cycle.

Collège Durocher Saint-Lambert ranked 18th in Quebec in 2008 in terms of the academic performance of its students according to a study by L'Actualité magazine.

References

External links 
 Collège Durocher Saint-Lambert

High schools in Montérégie
Education in Saint-Lambert, Quebec
Private schools in Quebec
Catholic secondary schools in Quebec
Buildings and structures in Saint-Lambert, Quebec
1910 establishments in Canada